Pascal Cervo (born 16 July 1977) is a French film director, screenwriter and actor.

Life and career 
Pascal Cervo grew up in Soisy-sur-Seine, Essonne, France.

He was discovered at the age of 16 while shopping in Paris by Catherine Corsini for her film Les Amoureux (with Nathalie Richard), where he played Marc, a teenager who began to realize his homosexuality. He then played in À toute vitesse (Full Speed), a film by  young Gaël Morel where he was Quentin, a writer that everyone falls in love with. Pascal Cervo pursues a career of strong loyalty, working with art filmmakers such as Gaël Morel, Laurent Achard, Paul Vecchiali (of whom Cervo is one of his favorite and recurring actors), Pierre Léon, etc. He also worked with Jean-Claude Biette and Robert Guédiguian and played in TV series and in theatre.

He directed three short films, the first in 2008 Valérie n'est plus ici (Valérie is not here anymore), then Monsieur Lapin (Mister Rabbit) - a reflection on loneliness - in 2013 and Hugues in 2017 which won the short film prize of festival of Pantin.

Pascal Cervo replies to Catherine Deneuve in Le Cancre (2016). He was recently praised for his first role in Jours de France (Four Days in France) in 2017, where he interprets Pierre who after leaving his companion Paul (Arthur Igual) travels France randomly and meets unknown people using Grindr.

Filmography

As actor
1994 : Les Amoureux by Catherine Corsini : Marc
1995 : À toute vitesse (Full Speed) by Gaël Morel : Quentin
1997 : Plus qu'hier moins que demain by Laurent Achard - Bernard
1998 : Prague vu par... by Petr Václav
1999 : The Girl by Sande Zeig - the receptionist
1999 : Peau d'homme, cœur de bête by Hélène Angel - Alex
2002 : La Guerre à Paris (The War in Paris) by Yolande Zauberman - Inspecteur Combes
2003 : Elle est des nôtres by Siegrid Alnoy
2003 : Saltimbank by Jean-Claude Biette - Félix
2006 : Le Dernier des fous (Demented) by Laurent Achard - Didier
2008 : Lady Jane by Robert Guédiguian -  lieutnant
2009 : L'Armée du crime (The Army of Crime) by Robert Guédiguian - Bourlier
2011 : À moi seule (Coming Home) by Frédéric Videau
2011 : En ville (Iris in Bloom) by Valérie Mréjen and Bertrand Schefer -  a friend
2011 : Dernière Séance (Last Screening) by Laurent Achard - Sylvain
2013 : Biette by Pierre Léon
2013 : Faux Accords by Paul Vecchiali
2014 : Fever by Raphaël Neal - Sasha
2015 : Nuits blanches sur la jetée by Paul Vecchiali - Fédor (from a novel by Dostoievsky)
2015 : C'est l'amour by Paul Vecchiali - Daniel
2015 : Deux Rémi, deux by Pierre Léon - Rémi Pardon (from a novel by Dostoievsky) 
2016 : Le Cancre by Paul Vecchiali - Laurent
2017 : Four Days in France by Jérôme Reybaud - Pierre Thomas
2017 : Drôles d'oiseaux (Strange Birds) by Élise Girard - Roman
2018 : Love Blooms by Michaël Dacheux - Jérôme
2022 : Le Lycéen (Winter Boy) by Christophe Honoré - Father Benoît

As actor in short films
 1998 : Coup de lune by Emmanuel Hamon
 1999 : Apesanteurs by Valérie Gaudissart
 2001 : Verte by Christophe Monier
 2006 : Histoire naturelle by Ysé Tran
 2008 : Prendre l'air by Nicolas Leclère (issued in 2014)
 2008 : Sans Howard by Ricardo Munoz - François
 2009 : Regarder Oana by Sébastien Laudenbach
 2009 : French Courvoisier by Valérie Mréjen
 2013 : Malfaisant by Alexia Walther and Maxime Matray
 2013 : Le Tableau by Laurent Achard - Loïc
 2014 : Just Married by Paul Vecchiali
 2014 : La Cérémonie by Paul Vecchiali
 2016 : Enfant chéri by Valérie Mréjen and Bertrand Schefer - Axel 
 2017 : Dernières nouvelles du monde by François Prodromidès - the messenger

As filmmaker 
 2009 : Valérie n'est plus ici - short film
 2013 : Monsieur Lapin - short film
 2017: Hugues - short film

References

External links

  Pascal Cervo Internet Movie Database

1977 births
Living people
people from Essonne
French male film actors
French film directors
French male screenwriters
French screenwriters
20th-century French male actors
21st-century French male actors